Espelho d'Água (Water Mirror) is a Portuguese telenovela which began airing on SIC on 1 May 2017 – 21 April 2018.

Plot 
Rita has no family, no money, no past.

Twenty years after the tragedy that left her with nothing, she will only stop when she finds her mother and brother, who she can barely remember.

She will also fight to find love and have the man who was destined for her by her side when you have the man you love beside.

To accomplish her goals, she will have to face those who took everything from her.

Rita has little memories about her past. She feels alone in a hostile world where she doesn't seem to fit in. She was left at a foster care center when she was very young and only remembers having grown up in institutions, spending a few seasons with families who took her in. Then, at the age of 24, she gets some information about her family: her father was killed and her mother disappeared with a baby brother.

In the eagerness to find them, and to learn more about her father, she goes to the cod fishing company that once belonged to the family. There, and without realizing it, she falls into the hands of the person responsible for the death of her father.

But it is also in looking for what she has lost, that she ends up finding the love of her life.

Water Mirror is a story about the loss of family and identity, about reencounters and construction of affective bonds.

It's a drama that shows us we are not meant to wander around the world alone.

Cast

References

2017 Portuguese television series debuts
2018 Portuguese television series endings
Portuguese telenovelas
2017 telenovelas
Sociedade Independente de Comunicação telenovelas
Portuguese-language telenovelas